Lesley McGuire (born 1970) is an Irish actress who played Jenny Delaney/Quinnan in The Bill and she has also appeared in Kavanagh QC, Silent Witness, Doctors and Shameless.

External links

English television actresses
English soap opera actresses
1970 births
Living people
21st-century English actresses
Place of birth missing (living people)
Date of birth missing (living people)